The 1941 San Francisco State States football team represented San Francisco State College—now known as San Francisco State University—as an independent during the 1941 college football season. Led by third-year head coach Dick Boyle, San Francisco State compiled a record of 2–4–1 and was outscored by its opponents 75 to 33. The team played home games at Roberts Field in San Francisco.

Schedule

Notes

References

San Francisco State
San Francisco State Gators football seasons
San Francisco State Gaters football